Jan Urbas (born January 26, 1989) is a Slovenian professional ice hockey player. He is currently playing with the Fischtown Pinguins in the Deutsche Eishockey Liga (DEL).

Playing career
He previously played with EHC München in the German Deutsche Eishockey Liga (DEL). On September 30, 2014, he opted to join EC KAC of the EBEL on a one-year contract. He played just 10 games with Klagenfurt in the 2014–15 season, before transferring to VIK Västerås HK of the HockeyAllsvenskan on March 11, 2015.

As a free agent after parts of two seasons with VIK in the Allsvenskan, Urbas returned to Austria to continue his professional career with EC VSV on July 14, 2016.

Career statistics

Regular season and playoffs

International

References

External links

1989 births
Living people
EHC München players
Fischtown Pinguins players
HK Olimpija players
Ice hockey players at the 2014 Winter Olympics
Ice hockey players at the 2018 Winter Olympics
EC KAC players
Malmö Redhawks players
Olympic ice hockey players of Slovenia
Slovenian ice hockey centres
Sportspeople from Ljubljana
Växjö Lakers players
VIK Västerås HK players
EC VSV players
Slovenian expatriate ice hockey people
Slovenian expatriate sportspeople in Germany
Slovenian expatriate sportspeople in Austria
Slovenian expatriate sportspeople in Sweden
Expatriate ice hockey players in Germany
Expatriate ice hockey players in Austria
Expatriate ice hockey players in Sweden